Chinmayanand may refer to:

 Chinmayananda Saraswati (1916–1993), an Indian Hindu spiritual leader and teacher
 Chinmayanand (politician), a member of parliament in India